The 2022–23 Cincinnati Bearcats men's basketball team represents the University of Cincinnati in the 2022–23 NCAA Division I men's basketball season. The Bearcats are led by second-year head coach Wes Miller. The team played their home games at Fifth Third Arena as members of the American Athletic Conference.  

In September 2021, Cincinnati and fellow conference members Houston and UCF accepted invitations to join the Big 12 Conference. The schools had been contractually required to remain with The American through 2024, but all reached a separation agreement that will allow them to join the Big 12 in 2023. Accordingly, the 2022–23 season will be the program's last season as a member of The American.

Previous season
The Bearcats finished the 2021–22 season 17–14, 7–11 in AAC play to finish seventh place. They defeated East Carolina  in the AAC tournament before losing to Houston in the quarterfinals.

Offseason

Player departures

Incoming transfers

Class of 2022
Cincinnati signed a three man class consisting of Sage Tolentino, Josh Reed and Daniel Skillings.

Class of 2023

Preseason

AAC preseason media poll
On October 12, The American released the preseason Poll and other preseason awards

Preseason Awards
 AAC Preseason All-Conference Second Team - David DeJulius

Roster

Schedule and results

|-
!colspan=12 style=| Regular Season

|-
!colspan=12 style=| AAC Regular Season

|-
!colspan=12 style=| AAC Tournament

|-
!colspan=12 style=| NIT

Source

Awards and honors

American Athletic Conference honors

All-AAC First Team
Landers Nolley II

All-AAC Third Team
David DeJulius

Player of the Week
Week 1: David DeJulius

Weekly Honor Roll
Week 4: Viktor Lakhin
Week 5: David DeJulius
Week 6: David DeJulius
Week 9: Viktor Lakhin
Week 10: Landers Nolley II
Week 11: Landers Nolley II
Week 12: Landers Nolley II
Week 13: David DeJulius
Week 15: David DeJulius
Week 17: David DeJulius

AAC All-Tournament Team
 Landers Nolley II

References

Cincinnati
Cincinnati Bearcats men's basketball seasons
Cincinnati Bearcats men's basketball
Cincinnati Bearcats men's basketball
Cincinnati